The Fine Arts Center, or The FAC, may refer to:

 Fine Arts Center (Massachusetts), at the University of Massachusetts Amherst
 Fine Arts Center (South Carolina), in Greenville

See also